Lola Montez, the King's Dancer is a 1922 German silent historical drama film directed by Willi Wolff and starring Ellen Richter, Arnold Korff, and Fritz Kampers. It portrays the life of Lola Montez. The film was produced by Richter's own production company, but was released by the dominant German distributor UFA.

A previous biopic Lola Montez had been released in 1919, starring Leopoldine Konstantin.

Plot summary

Cast

References

Bibliography

External links
 

1922 films
1920s biographical films
German biographical films
Films of the Weimar Republic
German silent feature films
Films directed by Willi Wolff
Films set in Munich
Films set in Barcelona
Films set in the 19th century
German black-and-white films
German historical films
1920s historical films
UFA GmbH films
Cultural depictions of Lola Montez
1920s German films